James Albert Reynolds (January 8, 1920 – January 30, 1985) was an American football fullback.

Reynolds was born in LaGrange, Georgia, in 1920 and attended LaGrange High School in that city. He played college football at Auburn. 

He played professional football for the Miami Seahawks of the All-America Football Conference in 1946.  He appeared in seven games, two of them as a starter. He rushed for 96 yards and two touchdowns on 32 carries. 

He died in 1985 in Chatham County, Georgia.

References

1920 births
1985 deaths
American football fullbacks
Miami Seahawks players
People from LaGrange, Georgia
Auburn Tigers football players
Players of American football from Georgia (U.S. state)